Árpád Szabó (31 December 1878 – 31 July 1948) was a Hungarian politician, who served as Speaker of the National Assembly of Hungary in 1947 and Minister of Agriculture between 1947 and 1948.

He taught in Mezőberény since 1901. He became head of the local National Council on 14 November 1918. In 1930 he was a founding member of the Independent Smallholders, Agrarian Workers and Civic Party. He served as representative in the National Assembly from 1945 until his death. He was appointed legislative speaker for a short time in 1947.

References
 Magyar Életrajzi Lexikon	

1878 births
1948 deaths
People from Dumbrăveni
People from the Kingdom of Hungary
Independent Smallholders, Agrarian Workers and Civic Party politicians
Agriculture ministers of Hungary
Speakers of the National Assembly of Hungary
Members of the National Assembly of Hungary (1945–1947)
Members of the National Assembly of Hungary (1947–1949)